Roy Pirrung (born July 7, 1948) is an American ultramarathoner, middle and long-distance runner,

Early life 
Roy Pirrung was born in Sheboygan, Wisconsin on July 7, 1948. He graduated from Sheboygan South High School in 1966, served in the U.S. Army from 1967 to 1970 and worked at the Kohler Company from 1972 to 2007.

Career 
His first race was a marathon at age 32 in 1981, shortly after he kicked a two-pack-a-day cigarette habit after he noticed an obese woman run by his home.

In 1997, he was named Ultra Runner of the Year and in 2002, 2007, 2008, 2009 and 2012 he was named the masters ultra runner of the year for his stellar seasons.

References

External links 
 
 
 

1948 births
Living people
American male ultramarathon runners
American male long-distance runners
American male marathon runners
Sportspeople from Sheboygan, Wisconsin
Kohler Company